Sergei Vladimirovich Zaytsev (born 9 March 1969) is a former Russian football player.

Club career
He made his Russian Premier League debut for FC Shinnik Yaroslavl on 30 August 1992 in a game against FC Fakel Voronezh.

References

1969 births
Living people
Soviet footballers
FC SKA-Khabarovsk players
Russian footballers
FC Shinnik Yaroslavl players
Russian Premier League players
Association football forwards
Association football midfielders